Black Run may refer to:

Black Run (Paxton Creek), in Dauphin County, Pennsylvania
Black Run (Spruce Run), in Union County, Pennsylvania

See also
Black Creek (disambiguation)
Black River (disambiguation)